George Nixon may refer to:

 George E. Nixon (1898–1981), Canadian Member of Parliament for Algoma West, 1940–1968
 George S. Nixon (1860–1912), American Senator from Nevada, 1905–1912
 George Adam Nixon (1923–1998), Canadian politician
 George Nixon (cricketer) (1850–1913), English cricketer
 George Nixon (priest), Archdeacon of Tuam, 1939–1950